Park Lane is a Tyne and Wear Metro station, serving the port city of Sunderland in Tyne and Wear, England. It joined the network on 28 April 2002, following the opening of the extension from Pelaw to South Hylton.

History
The station is located below Park Lane Bus Station, which opened in May 1999, as a replacement for the former Sunderland Central Bus Station.

Along with other stations on the line between Fellgate and South Hylton, the station is fitted with vitreous enamel panels designed by artist, Morag Morrison. Each station uses a different arrangement of colours, with strong colours used in platform shelters and ticketing areas, and a more neutral palate for external elements.

Facilities 
The station houses a Nexus TravelShop, as well as various retail outlets, including a newsagent, coffee shop and bakery.

Step-free access is available at all stations across the Tyne and Wear Metro network, with two lifts providing step-free access to platforms at Park Lane. The station is equipped with ticket machines, seating, next train information displays, timetable posters, and an emergency help point on both platforms. Ticket machines are able to accept payment with credit and debit card (including contactless payment), notes and coins. The station is also fitted with smartcard validators, which were installed at all stations across the network during the early 2010s.

A pay and display car park (operated by Sunderland City Council) is available, with 630 spaces, as well as a taxi rank. There is also the provision for cycle parking, with six cycle pods available.

Services 
, the station is served by up to five trains per hour on weekdays and Saturday, and up to four trains per hour during the evening and on Sunday.

Rolling stock used: Class 599 Metrocar

Bus Station
Park Lane Bus Station opened in May 1999, as a replacement for the former Sunderland Central Bus Station. It is located on the site of the former Park Lane Bus Station, which was constructed during the 1930s.

It is served by Arriva North East and Go North East's local bus services, with frequent routes serving Sunderland and South Tyneside, as well as County Durham, Gateshead, Newcastle upon Tyne and Teesside. The bus station has 19 departure stands (lettered A–V), with an additional two stands used by long-distance coach services. Each stand is fitted with a waiting shelter, seating, next bus information displays, and timetable posters.

Notes

References

External links
 
 Timetable and station information for Park Lane

Bus stations in Tyne and Wear
Sunderland
2002 establishments in England
Railway stations in Great Britain opened in 2002
Tyne and Wear Metro Green line stations
Transport in the City of Sunderland
Transport in Tyne and Wear